The 2009 Super 14 season kicked off in February 2009 with pre-season matches held from mid-January. It finished on 30 May, when the Bulls won their second Super Rugby title with a decisive 61–17 victory over the Chiefs at Loftus Versfeld stadium in Pretoria, South Africa. The 2009 season was the fourth of the expansion, which led to the name change to the Super 14. The schedule, which covered 3½ months, featured a total of 94 matches, with each team playing one full round-robin against the 13 other teams, two semi-finals and a final. Every team received one bye over the 14 rounds.

Table

Results

Round 1 

 Todd Clever came off the bench for the Lions to become the first American ever to play in Super Rugby.

Round 2

Round 3

Round 4

Round 5

Round 6

Round 7

Round 8

Round 9

Round 10

Round 11

Round 12

Round 13

Round 14

Playoffs

Semi-finals

Final

This large win by the Bulls, is the highest winning score, and the highest winning margin ever in a Super 14 final.

Player statistics

Leading try scorers

Leading point scorers

Attendances

References

External links
 

 
2009
 
 
 
2009 rugby union tournaments for clubs